Tomáš Peciar (born 10 June 1988 in Bojnice) is a Slovak football central defender who currently plays for FC Andau in the Austrian 2. Landesliga (fifth tier).

Career

He played one match in the Gambrinus Liga for Viktoria Žižkov. In July 2013, Peciar left Budissa Bautzen to sign for Greenock Morton. Peciar left Morton in January 2014 as his fiancée did not wish to move to Scotland, and signed with Östersund in Sweden.

See also
Greenock Morton F.C. season 2013–14

References

External links
AS Trenčín profile 

1988 births
Living people
Slovakia under-21 international footballers
Sportspeople from Bojnice
Slovak footballers
Association football central defenders
Almere City FC players
Eerste Divisie players
AS Trenčín players
TJ Baník Ružiná players
Slovak Super Liga players
Slovak expatriate footballers
Slovak expatriate sportspeople in the Netherlands
Expatriate footballers in the Netherlands
FK Viktoria Žižkov players
Czech First League players
Expatriate footballers in the Czech Republic
Expatriate footballers in Germany
Expatriate footballers in Sweden
Expatriate footballers in Scotland
Greenock Morton F.C. players
Association football fullbacks
Scottish Professional Football League players
Slovak expatriate sportspeople in Scotland
Östersunds FK players
Superettan players
Expatriate footballers in Austria
Slovak expatriate sportspeople in Austria
FSV Budissa Bautzen players